Red Sucker Lake Airport  is located adjacent to Red Sucker Lake, Manitoba, Canada.

Airlines and destinations

See also
Red Sucker Lake Water Aerodrome

References

Certified airports in Manitoba

Island Lake Tribal Council
Transport in Northern Manitoba